Zbigniew Franciszek Rynasiewicz (born 4 October 1963) is a Polish politician. He was elected to the Sejm on 25 September 2005, getting 10,354 votes in 23 Rzeszów district as a candidate from the Civic Platform list. Reelected on 21 October 2007.

He was also a member of Sejm 1997-2001.

See also
Members of Polish Sejm 2005-2007

External links
Zbigniew Rynasiewicz - parliamentary page - includes declarations of interest, voting record, and transcripts of speeches.

Members of the Polish Sejm 2005–2007
Members of the Polish Sejm 1997–2001
Civic Platform politicians
1963 births
Living people
People from Leżajsk County
Members of the Polish Sejm 2007–2011